Tibor Szabó may refer to:

Tibor Szabó, musician Iván Madarász
Tibor Szabó (footballer, born 1977), Hungarian football midfielder
Tibor Szabo (English footballer) (born 1959), English footballer